Kentucky Route 284 (KY 284) is a  state highway in the U.S. state of Kentucky. The highway connects Paducah, Woodlawn-Oakdale, and Reidland, within McCracken County.

Route description
KY 284 begins at an intersection with US 60/US 62 (Irvin Cobb Drive) in the far southeastern part of Paducah, within McCracken County, where the roadway continues as Bridge Street. There are railroad tracks crossing through the intersection. It travels to the southeast and intersects the northern terminus of KY 2187 (Husband Road) on the southwestern edge of Kennedy Park. It crosses over some railroad tracks, entering Woodlawn-Oakdale. It intersects the northern terminus of KY 450 (Silk Tree Boulevard) and travels under a bridge that carries KY 1954 (John L. Puryear Drive) and then crosses over Clarks River, leaving Woodlawn-Oakdale. The highway travels just south of Priester Lake, curves to the south-southeast, and enters Reidland. It passes Reidland Middle School. It curves to the east-northeast and intersects KY 131 (Benton Road) and the western terminus of KY 1887 (Park Road). KY 131/KY 248 travels concurrently to the south-southwest and intersects the northern terminus of KY 787 (Calvert Drive). The two highways curve to the south-southeast and intersect the eastern terminus of KY 3075 (Sheehan Bridge Road). They curve to the southeast and begin traveling along the southeastern edge of Reidland. They cross over Interstate 24 (I-24) and then split. KY 284 leaves Reidland and continues to the southeast, curves to the east-northeast, and meets its eastern terminus, an intersection with US 68 (Benton Road).

Major intersections

See also

References

0284
Transportation in McCracken County, Kentucky
Paducah, Kentucky
Paducah micropolitan area